Alfie Pond (born 17 February  2004) is an English professional footballer who plays as a defender for  club Wolverhampton Wanderers.

Playing career
Pond made his first-team debut for Exeter City in the EFL Trophy, in a 1–1 draw with Chelsea U21 at St James Park. Speaking after the match, manager Matt Taylor described him as someone who would become "a serious player".

On 12 August 2022, Pond joined National League side Yeovil Town on loan until January 2023.

On 2 September 2022, Pond signed for Premier League side Wolverhampton Wanderers for an undisclosed fee.

Career statistics

References

2004 births
Living people
English footballers
Sportspeople from Exeter
Association football defenders
Exeter City F.C. players
Tiverton Town F.C. players
Yeovil Town F.C. players
Wolverhampton Wanderers F.C. players
English Football League players
Southern Football League players
National League (English football) players